Seixalbo is a parish located in the south of Ourense in Spain. In 2011, there were 1,088 inhabitants (531 men and 557 women).

Parishes in the Province of Ourense